Thicker than Water is a 1999 film directed by Richard Cummings Jr. and starring a host of rappers and urban entertainers such as Fat Joe, Mack 10, Ice Cube, MC Eiht, Big Pun, and others. The film contains rappers from both the East and the West Coast, as it was made after the end of the East Coast-West Coast feud.

Plot 
In Los Angeles, two rival gang leaders are also trying to be music producers. When DJ's (Mack 10) equipment shorts out and Lonzo (Fat Joe) is cut out of the action by a record producer, the two join forces, which also requires a tentative peace between gangs. With backing from Gator (CJ Mac), a smooth New Orleans drug king, DJ and Lonzo start drug dealing, organizing their gangs into pushers. Just as their finances are looking up, one of Gator's team pulls a double cross and two of DJ and Lonzo's gang bangers start a shooting war. Can the erstwhile music producers salvage anything of their bond or their plans?

Cast

Soundtrack 

A soundtrack containing hip hop music was released on October 5, 1999, by Priority Records. It peaked at #64 on the Billboard 200 and #8 Top R&B/Hip-Hop Albums. It spawned a single in "Let It Reign" by Westside Connection.

External links 

 
 

1999 drama films
1999 films
American gang films
Hood films
American drama films
Films scored by Tyler Bates
1990s hip hop films
1990s English-language films
1990s American films